Epiestriol (brand names Actriol, Arcagynil, Klimadoral), or epioestriol, also known as 16β-epiestriol or simply 16-epiestriol as well as 16β-hydroxy-17β-estradiol, is a minor and weak endogenous estrogen, and the 16β-epimer of estriol (which is 16α-hydroxy-17β-estradiol). Epiestriol is (or has previously been) used clinically in the treatment of acne. In addition to its estrogenic actions, epiestriol has been found to possess significant anti-inflammatory properties without glycogenic activity or immunosuppressive effects, an interesting finding that is in contrast to conventional anti-inflammatory steroids like hydrocortisone (a glucocorticoid).

See also 
 17α-Epiestriol
 16β,17α-Epiestriol
 Epimestrol
 Mytatrienediol

References 

Anti-acne preparations
Anti-inflammatory agents
Estranes
Estrogens
Hormones of the hypothalamus-pituitary-gonad axis
Sex hormones